Couldn't Stand the Weather is the second studio album by American blues rock band Stevie Ray Vaughan and Double Trouble. It was released on May 15, 1984, by Epic Records as the follow-up to the band's critically and commercially successful 1983 album, Texas Flood. Recording sessions took place in January 1984 at the Power Station in New York City.

Stevie Ray Vaughan wrote half the tracks on Couldn't Stand the Weather. The album reached No. 31 on the Billboard 200 chart and the music video for "Couldn't Stand the Weather" received regular rotation on MTV. The album received mostly positive reviews, with AllMusic giving it a four out of five stars. It received praise for Vaughan’s playing and highlighted songs such as "Voodoo Chile" and "Tin Pan Alley", but received criticism for the lack of original songs.

In 1999, a reissue of the album was released which contains an audio interview segment and four studio outtakes. In 2010, the album was reissued as a Legacy Edition containing two CDs with a previously unreleased studio outtake and selections from an August 17, 1984, concert at The Spectrum in Montreal, Canada, originally recorded for the King Biscuit Flower Hour radio program.

Recording and production
During January 1984, Vaughan and Double Trouble spent 19 days at the Power Station recording studio in New York City. John Hammond was executive producer and supervised the sessions. The album was produced by the band along with Richard Mullen and Jim Capfer. The album was engineered by Mullen and Rob Eaton. Graphic artist Holland MacDonald designed the album cover art with assistance from Shostal Associates for the tornado image, a photograph of the 1957 Fargo tornado.

Reception

The album was another commercial success for Stevie Ray Vaughan, selling 1,000,000 copies within five weeks. Stephen Thomas Erlewine of Allmusic wrote: "

Robert Christgau wrote in his review that "Though he comes close sometimes, this Texan ain't Hendrix. But between earned Jimi cover and lyric refreshment, album two is almost everything a reasonable person might hope from him: a roadhouse album with gargantuan sonic imagination."

Track listings

Original Release

Details are taken from the 1984 Epic Records album liner notes; reissues show several different songwriter credits.

1999 Reissue Bonus Tracks

"SRV Speaks" is from a studio interview with Timothy White for Westwood One Radio. The remaining bonus tracks are studio outtakes from the sessions for the album.

2010 Legacy Edition 2-CD reissue

Personnel
Double Trouble
Stevie Ray Vaughan – guitar, vocals
Tommy Shannon – bass guitar
Chris Layton – drums

Additional personnel
Jimmie Vaughan – rhythm guitar on "Couldn't Stand the Weather" and "The Things That I Used to Do"
Fran Christina – drums on "Stang's Swang"
Stan Harrison – tenor saxophone on "Stang's Swang"

Production
Producers – Stevie Ray Vaughan and Double Trouble, Richard Mullen, Jim Capfer
Executive producer – John H. Hammond
Engineer – Richard Mullen
Assistant engineer – Rob Eaton
Cover art – Holland MacDonald
Photography – Benno Friedman

1999 reissue
Producer – Bob Irwin
Executive producer – Tony Martell
Mastering engineer – Vic Anesini
Tracks 10–13 mixed by Danny Kadar
Dialogue edited by Darcy Proper
Research assistants – George Deahl, Al Quaglieri, Matthew Kelly, Jon Naatjes
Art director – Josh Cheuse
Editorial director – Andy Schwartz
Liner notes – Bill Milkowski

2010 Legacy Edition issue
Photography – Jean Krettler, Robert Matheu, James Minchen III
Liner notes – Andy Aledort

Charts

Weekly charts

Year-end charts

Certifications

Notes

References

1984 albums
Stevie Ray Vaughan albums
Epic Records albums
Albums recorded at the Spectrum (Montreal)